Anapisa lamborni is a moth of the  family Erebidae. It was described by Rothschild in 1913. It is found in Nigeria.

References

Endemic fauna of Nigeria
Moths described in 1913
Syntomini
Insects of West Africa
Erebid moths of Africa